Sir Richard Sims Donkin Rankine, KCMG (1875 – 24 June 1961) was a British colonial administrator. He was the British Resident in Zanzibar from 1930 to 1937.

References 
 "Sir Richard Rankine", The Times, 26 June 1961, p. 14.

Resident ministers of Zanzibar
Knights Commander of the Order of St Michael and St George
1875 births
1961 deaths
Date of birth missing
Place of birth missing